The Garden State Discovery Museum was a children's museum located in Cherry Hill, New Jersey.

Overview
The museum was founded in 1994 and hosted over 150,000 visitors annually, providing various opportunities for infants to 10-year-olds and their adult companions. Some exhibits included: 
Under Construction – a two-story "unbuilt" playhouse
Vet & Pet – an animal health-care clinic
Rock Climbing Wall 
Silver Diner – a pretend restaurant with a kitchen, milkshake machine, and cash registers
Check-Up – a pretend doctor's office
Down the Shore – a pretend boat 
Farm Stand – a produce stand with fake fruit and vegetables
Backstage Theater – includes a dressing room, costumes, sound system, and 100 seats 
Channel 6 Action News Studio – pretend news desk and camera provided by WPVI-TV
Nature Center – includes tree house, giant spider web, and puppets
Subaru Science Shop and Service Station – provided by Subaru of America
Train Safety- a railroad simulator game developed by operation lifesaver of the dos and DONTS on railroad safety. Hosted by Tracks the animated railroad crossing signal. 

In addition, the museum offered many educational classes for children as well as a drama and music program. All programs were free with admission.

The Garden State Discovery Museum permanently closed their doors in March 2020, shortly before the COVID-19 pandemic hit.

Recognition
The Garden State Discovery Museum was listed as one of the top 50 children's museums in the United States by Parents magazine.

References

External links

NJ Winter Getaways: Garden State Discovery Museum a great field trip destination

Cherry Hill, New Jersey
Children's museums in New Jersey
Defunct museums in New Jersey
Museums established in 1994
Museums in Camden County, New Jersey
1994 establishments in New Jersey
Museums disestablished in 2020